Buckhorn is an unincorporated community in southeastern Madison County, in the U.S. state of Missouri.

The community is located on Missouri Route M at the location where the West, Middle and East forks of Big Creek converge. The site is approximately 1.5 miles north of the Madison-Wayne county line. The community of Cascade is about three miles south on Big Creek.

History
A post office called Buckhorn was established in 1901, and remained in operation until 1959. The community took its name from a nearby creek of the same name where bucks were abundant.

References

Unincorporated communities in Madison County, Missouri
Unincorporated communities in Missouri